The 2017–18 season was the 151st season in Chesterfield's history and their first season back in League Two for four years, following relegation the previous season. Along with League Two, the club participated in the FA Cup, League Cup and EFL Trophy.

The season covers the period from 1 July 2017 to 30 June 2018.

Transfers

Transfers in

Transfers out

Loans in

Loans out

Players

Current squad

Out on loan

Competitions

Friendlies

League Two

League table

Results summary

Results by matchday

Matches
On 21 June 2017, the league fixtures were announced.

EFL Cup

On 16 June 2017, Chesterfield were drawn away to Sheffield Wednesday in the first round.

FA Cup

EFL Trophy
On 12 July 2017, Chesterfield were drawn in Northern Group F against Bradford City, Rotherham United and Manchester City U23s.

Statistics

Appearances
As of 5 May 2018
Italics indicate loan player
Asterisk (*) indicates player left club mid-season
Caret sign (^) indicates player finished season on loan at another club
Hash sign (#) indicates player retired mid-season
Source: 

|}

Goalscorers

References

Chesterfield F.C. seasons
Chesterfield